Michelle Helene Isabelle De Jongh (born 19 May 1997) is a Swedish professional footballer who plays as a midfielder for Linköpings FC.

Honours

Club 
KIF Örebro DFF
Runner-up
 Damallsvenskan: 2014

International 
Sweden U19
Winner
 UEFA Women's Under-19 Championship: 2015

References

External links 
 
 Profile at Swedish Football Association (SvFF) 

1997 births
Living people
Swedish women's footballers
KIF Örebro DFF players
Vittsjö GIK players
Damallsvenskan players
Women's association football midfielders
FC Fleury 91 (women) players
Swedish expatriate sportspeople in France
Expatriate women's footballers in France
Division 1 Féminine players
Sweden women's youth international footballers
21st-century Swedish women